The 1934 Washington State Cougars football team was an American football team that represented Washington State College during the 1934 college football season. Ninth-year head coach Babe Hollingbery led the team to a 4–0–1 mark in the PCC and 4–3–1 overall.

The Cougars played their three home games on campus at Rogers Field in Pullman, Washington;  a road game was played in Spokane at Gonzaga.

Schedule

References

External links
 Game program: Montana at WSC – September 29, 1934
 Game program: Oregon State at WSC – October 27, 1934
 Game program: Idaho at WSC – November 10, 1934

Washington State
Washington State Cougars football seasons
Washington State Cougars football